Seeing Calvin Coolidge in a Dream is a 1996 book by John Derbyshire.  It was a New York Times "Notable Book of the Year".

Plot
A Capraesque yarn of midlife crisis, romance and spirituality told by a Chinese immigrant banker residing in suburban New York, who nearly destroys his marriage and finds salvation in the words and deeds of President Calvin Coolidge.

References

External links

Publishers Weekly review

1996 novels
Novels set in New York (state)
Cultural depictions of Calvin Coolidge
Novels about dreams
Novels about midlife crisis
St. Martin's Press books